Euphorbia setiloba is a species of euphorb known by the common name Yuma sandmat. It is native to the southwestern United States and northern Mexico, where it grows in dry habitat. This is a small, clumping annual herb with slender stems lined with pairs of tiny hairy leaves. Each leaf is just a few millimeters long and oval in shape with a bluntly pointed tip. The minute inflorescence is a cyathium less than two millimeters wide. It has distinctive appendages which are white with a few narrow, sharp-pointed lobes. There is a red nectar gland at the base of each. At the center of the appendages are the actual flowers, one female and several male. The ovary of the female flower develops into a hairy, spherical fruit about a millimeter wide.

External links
Jepson Manual Treatment
USDA Plants Profile
Vascular Plants of the Gila Wilderness
Photo gallery

setiloba
Flora of Northeastern Mexico
Flora of Northwestern Mexico
Flora of the Southwestern United States
Flora of California
Flora of New Mexico
Flora of Texas
Flora of the Sonoran Deserts
Flora of the California desert regions
Natural history of the Colorado Desert
Natural history of the Mojave Desert
Flora without expected TNC conservation status